"Bubble" is the ninth single by the English electronic music band Fluke and was their only single released in 1994.

Versions

Fluke (band) songs
1994 singles
1994 songs